Kalamandalam Rajan is a Kathakali exponent from Kerala, India. He has been honored with several noted awards including the Sangeet Natak Akademi Award 2009, Kerala Sangeetha Nataka Akademi Gurupooja award 2006 and awards from Kerala Kalamandalam.

Biography
Kalamandalam Rajan was born in 1931 at Ezhikkara, North Paravur in Ernakulam district of Kerala to Sreedhara Panikar of Nellipuzha house in Aroor and Kochukuttyamma of Ezhikkara Kadakkara Erappath house. After school, he studied and paracticed dance. During this period, he saw Kalamandalam Krishnan Nair Ashan performing Poothanamoksham Kathakali. Seeing that performance, Rajan decided to learn Kathakali. He joined Kerala Kalamandalam in 1955 and studied kathakali under noted kathakali artists like Kalamandalam Padmanabhan Nair, Kalamandalam Ramankutty Nair, Keezhpadam Kumaran Nair and Vazhenkada Kunchu Nair. in 1965 he joined Tripunithura RLV college as an assistant dance master in kathakali and retired from there as head of the Fine Arts Section. In 1985 he was re-appointed as visiting Professor in the same institution.

In Kathakali Rajan was expert in pacha, kathi and minukku roles. His performances as Bahuka, Nala and Dharmaputra have been critically acclaimed. He had performed in many stages India and abroad with Margi Kathakali Vidyalayam, Thiruvananthapuram, and was part of the Kathakali Festival conducted by Sangeet Natak Akademi in New Delhi in 1993.

He died on June 14, 2012, at the age of 81 at his house in Thrippunithura, Ernakulam district.

Family
He and  his wife Sulochana have one daughter.

Awards and honors
Sangeet Natak Akademi Award 2009
Kerala Sangeetha Nataka Akademi Gurupooja award 2006
Kalamandalam Krishnan Nair Memorial Award 2001
Kalamandalam Karunakaran Smaraka Award 2007
Pattikkamthodi Ravunni Menon Memorial Kathakali Award bestowed by Kerala Kalamandalam 2008

References

1931 births
2012 deaths
20th-century Indian dancers
Dancers from Kerala
Kathakali exponents
People from Ernakulam district
Recipients of the Sangeet Natak Akademi Award
Malayali people
Indian male dancers